San Ysidro Church is a historic church on Church Road in Corrales, New Mexico.  It was erected in 1868 and added to the National Register of Historic Places in 1980.

It is the second of three churches named after Saint Isidore (Ysidro), the patron saint of farmers.   It is a one-story adobe church with towers added in 1929.

See also

National Register of Historic Places listings in Sandoval County, New Mexico

References

Roman Catholic churches in New Mexico
Churches on the National Register of Historic Places in New Mexico
Roman Catholic churches completed in 1868
Buildings and structures in Sandoval County, New Mexico
National Register of Historic Places in Sandoval County, New Mexico
Adobe churches in New Mexico
1868 establishments in New Mexico Territory
19th-century Roman Catholic church buildings in the United States